The 16th Guards Fighter Aviation Division was an Aviation Division of the Soviet Air Forces, active from 1942 to 1998. Originally activated in 1942 as the 258th Fighter Aviation Division from the Air Forces of the 14th Army, then the 258th Mixed Aviation Division 27.2.43; redesignated in accordance with NKO Decree No. 264 as the 1st Guards Composite Aviation Division от 24.08.43; redesignated 16th Guards Fighter Aviation Division (16 GvIAD) 11 November 1944.

World War II
Regiments active with the division during the war included:
17th Guards Assault Aviation Regiment (ГШАП, GShAP)
19th Guards Fighter Aviation Regiment (ГИАП, GIAP) (26.11.42 - 13.01.45)
20th Guards Fighter Aviation Regiment (26.11.42 - 13.01.45)
114th Guards Bomber Aviation Regiment (ГБАП, GBAP)
152nd Fighter Aviation Regiment (ИАП, IAP) (06.44 - 13.01.45)
668th Assault Aviation Regiment (ШАП, ShAP)
773rd Fighter Aviation Regiment (09.44 - 13.01.45)
858th Fighter Aviation Regiment (08.44 - ...)

From 1945 to 1949, the regiments of the division included the 19th Guards Fighter Aviation Regiment, 20th Guards Fighter Aviation Regiment, and 152nd Fighter Aviation Regiment. 152 IAP disbanded during this period and was replaced by 773 IAP. From its formation from the 258th Aviation Division, to February 1945, it was attached to 14th Army. It was then reassigned to the Belomorsky Military District until 1953. Thereafter it joined the 16th Air Army as part of the Group of Soviet Forces in Germany. Its headquarters was at Damgarten from October 1953 for many years. As a fighter formation in Germany it appears that it would have faced the NATO air forces in Allied Air Forces Central Europe had any conflict broken out.

Organisation 1960
19th Guards Fighter Aviation Regiment (Wittstock, Germany) with MiG-15/17
20th Guards Fighter Aviation Regiment (Parchim, Germany) with MiG-17
773rd Fighter Aviation Regiment (Damgarten, Germany) with MiG-17

Two regiments were converted to Fighter-Bomber Aviation Regiments (19th Guards and 20th Guards) in 1961, and were replaced by two Fighter Aviation Regiments (33rd and 787th), from the 125th Fighter Aviation Division.

Structure in the GDR in 1990
33rd Fighter Aviation Regiment (Wittstock) (MiG-29)
773rd Fighter Aviation Regiment (Damgarten) (MiG-29) (returned to Andreapol in 1994 and later absorbed by 28th Guards Fighter Aviation Regiment)
787th Fighter Aviation Regiment (Finow)

The division remained as part of Group of Soviet Forces in Germany until October 1993.

Composition 1995 in the North Caucasus
19th Guards Fighter Aviation Regiment, at Millerovo (MiG-29)
31st Guards Fighter Aviation Regiment, at Zernograd (MiG-29)

It was finally disbanded after serving several years with 4th Air Army in May 1998 while at Millerovo in the North Caucasus Military District.

References

External links
https://web.archive.org/web/20120401124839/http://www.ww2.dk/new/air%20force/division/iad/16gviad.htm
http://wio.ru/simbols/iad16g.htm Images of 16 GIAD warplanes

Military units and formations established in 1942
Military units and formations disestablished in 1998
Aviation divisions of the Soviet Air Forces
Aviation divisions of the Russian Air Forces
Fighter aircraft units and formations of the Soviet Union
Air units and formations of the Soviet Union in World War II
1942 establishments in the Soviet Union